Ailiidae is a family of catfishes native to Asia. These fishes usually have dorsal fins with a short base and a spine, but Ailia lack a dorsal fin altogether.

References

Fish of Asia
Catfish families
Taxa named by Pieter Bleeker